Hagop Tchaparian is British-Armenian musician, who released his debut album on Text Records in 2022. Tchaparian had previously been guitarist for the British pop-punk band Symposium and worked as a  tour manager for Hot Chip and Four Tet.

Discography
Bolts (2022, Text Records)

References

British people of Armenian descent
British electronic musicians
Year of birth missing (living people)
Living people